Martin Dougan (born 31 May 1987 in Partick, Glasgow) is a Scottish television presenter. He was born with cerebral palsy and is a former captain of Glasgow's wheelchair basketball team.

He first came to prominence in 2012 as a commentator for the Paralympics. He was a torchbearer for the Olympic torch, carrying the torch at Meadowbank Stadium in Edinburgh. He is a television presenter and the main reporter for Newsround and in 2013 he featured in Channel 4's prank show, I'm Spazticus, challenging the public view on disability. In 2019, he was a reporter on the Australian Children's news programme, Behind the News.

References

External links

1988 births
Living people
Scottish people with disabilities
Sportspeople with cerebral palsy
Scottish disabled sportspeople
Scottish television presenters
Television presenters with disabilities